David Yeagley (September 5, 1951 – March 11, 2014) was a Comanche, classical composer, conservative political writer and activist. He was born in Oklahoma City, Oklahoma. He earned a bachelor's degree from Oberlin Conservatory, a Master of Arts from Emory University, an Artist Diploma from the University of Hartford (Hartt School of Music), and a Doctorate from the University of Arizona. He was the first American Indian ever admitted to Yale Divinity School, where he earned a Master of Divinity degree.

Yeagley wrote for the right-wing online FrontPage Magazine.

In 2011, Yeagley filed a lawsuit against the organization One People's Project for participating in actions that allegedly led to the cancellation of an American Renaissance conference in 2010 where he was scheduled to speak.

References

External links

1951 births
2014 deaths
20th-century classical composers
21st-century classical composers
20th-century American composers
21st-century American composers
20th-century American journalists
American male journalists
20th-century American male writers
20th-century American non-fiction writers
20th-century Native Americans
21st-century Native Americans
21st-century American non-fiction writers
American classical composers
American columnists
American male non-fiction writers
American political commentators
American political writers
American social commentators
Comanche people
Emory University alumni
Musicians from Oklahoma City
Native American journalists
Native American writers
Oberlin College alumni
University of Arizona alumni
Writers from Oklahoma City
Yale Divinity School alumni
21st-century American male writers